Anwar Elyounoussi (born 29 March 1999) is a Norwegian football defender who plays for Norwegian club Kvik Halden.
He has also previously played for Sarpsborg 08 in Norway, Botev Plovdiv in Bulgaria and Fremad Amager in Denmark.

Career
He started his career in Sarpsborg and also made his senior debut there, at the fifth tier, before joining Sarpsborg 08's youth setup ahead of the 2015 season. He signed for the senior team and made his senior debut in the 2018 Norwegian Football Cup, but did not make his league debut until 2019. In the autumn of 2019 he was loaned out to third-tiers Fram.

Elyounoussi left Sarpsborg 08 at the end of 2020. On 23 February 2021, Elyounoussi signed with Bulgarian club Botev Plovdiv. However, he only played one minute from February to July. To get more playing time, he was loaned out to Danish 1st Division club Fremad Amager on 7 July 2021 for the 2020-21 season. The Danish club had the same owners as Botev Plovdiv. However, after Fremad Amager was sold at the end of 2021, the club announced on 17 February 2022, that Elyounoussi was one of several players who had left the club.

Personal life
He is a younger brother of Mohamed Elyounoussi and first cousin of Tarik Elyounoussi.

References

External links

1999 births
Living people
People from Sarpsborg
Norwegian people of Moroccan descent
Norwegian footballers
Norwegian expatriate footballers
Association football defenders
Sarpsborg FK players
Sarpsborg 08 FF players
IF Fram Larvik players
Botev Plovdiv players
Fremad Amager players
Kvik Halden FK players
Norwegian Fourth Division players
Norwegian Third Division players
Norwegian Second Division players
Eliteserien players
Danish 1st Division players
First Professional Football League (Bulgaria) players
Expatriate footballers in Bulgaria
Expatriate men's footballers in Denmark
Norwegian expatriate sportspeople in Bulgaria
Norwegian expatriate sportspeople in Denmark
Sportspeople from Viken (county)